Sam Hoffman is a producer, director and writer who has created content in film, television and on digital media. Hoffman wrote and directed the film Humor Me, starring Jemaine Clement, Elliott Gould and Ingrid Michaelson. The film premiered at the Los Angeles Film Festival.

Career 
Hoffman produces and periodically directs the CBS drama Madam Secretary.  He is also developing, with producing partner Frances McDormand, an adaptation of Michael Pollan’s best-seller The Omnivore’s Dilemma.

Hoffman created the web series Old Jews Telling Jokes, which has been viewed over 50 million times, released on DVD, and broadcast on the BBC. His book, based on the series, is now in its sixth printing and the off-Broadway play derived from the series currently tours throughout North America.

Feature films he has produced include Wes Anderson’s Moonrise Kingdom, John Carney’s Begin Again and Richard Loncraine’s 5 Flights Up.  Earlier in his career, Hoffman also assistant directed such acclaimed titles as: The Royal Tenenbaums, School of Rock, Donnie Brasco, Dead Man Walking and Groundhog Day.

Filmography

References

External links

Year of birth missing (living people)
Living people
American film directors
American film producers